was the 5th daimyō of Shibata Domain in Echigo Province, Japan (modern-day Niigata Prefecture). His courtesy title was Hōki-no-kami, and his Court rank was Junior Fifth Rank, Lower Grade.

Biography
Mizoguchi Shigemoto was the eldest son of Mizoguchi Shigekatsu and was born in Shibata. He was received in formal audience by Shōgun Tokugawa Tsunayoshi in 1694 and became daimyō in 1706 on the retirement of his father. He encouraged the development of scholarship and martial arts in the domain, and invited disciples of the noted Confucian philosopher and educator Itō Jinsai to the domain in 1715.

He died in Edo in 1719 at the age of 39.  His grave is at the temple of Kisshō-ji in Tokyo.

Shigemoto was married to a daughter of Maida Toshiaki of Daishōji Domain, and after her death remarried to Masa, the daughter of the kuge Nakanoin Michiomi. He had 2 sons and 1 daughter; however, his eldest son and daughter both died in childhood.

See also
Mizoguchi clan

References 
 "Shibata-han" on Edo 300 HTML ) 
 The content of much of this article was derived from that of the corresponding article on Japanese Wikipedia.

Tozama daimyo
1680 births
1719 deaths
Mizoguchi clan
People of Edo-period Japan